The 2004 Ukrainian Figure Skating Championships took place between 23 and 25 December 2003 in Kyiv. Skaters competed in the disciplines of men's singles, ladies' singles, pair skating, and ice dancing on the senior level. The results were used to choose the teams to the 2004 World Championships and the 2004 European Championships.

Results

Men

Ladies

Pairs

Ice dancing

External links
 results

Ukrainian Figure Skating Championships
2003 in figure skating
Ukrainian Figure Skating Championships, 2004
2003 in Ukrainian sport
2004 in Ukrainian sport
December 2003 sports events in Ukraine